The 2014 FA WSL Cup Final was the fourth final of the FA WSL Cup, England's secondary cup competition for women's football teams and its primary league cup tournament. Manchester City beat Arsenal 1-0.

References

Cup
FA Women's Super League Cup finals
FA WSL Cup Final
FA WSL Cup Final, 2014
WSLC 2014